Linckia guildingi, also called the common comet star, Guilding's sea star or the green Linckia, is a species of sea star reported from the shallow waters of the tropical Pacific Ocean, Indian Ocean, Atlantic Ocean and the Caribbean Sea.

Taxonomy
Recent studies have indicated that Linckia guildingi may represent several cryptic species. Examination of the mtDNA showed that there are two clades within L. guildingi. The divergence between these implies that they separated over a million years ago.

Distribution
This species was described from St Vincent's, (Saint Vincent (Antilles)) in the Caribbean Sea.

Description
L. guildingi has a small disc and usually 5 (occasionally 4 or 6) long cylindrical arms. The upper surface appears smooth but is in fact rough to the touch with low, firm nodules. Though this starfish is often green, it comes in a range of colours including various shades of brown, blue and dull red.

Biology

L. guildingi sometimes exhibits autotomy, shedding one or more of its arms. In a study on Hawaii, it was found that autotomy happens less frequently than in the related species, Linckia multifora, also found in these waters. In time the arm will regenerate and in both species, the detached arms, known as "comets", are capable of moving about independently and themselves developing into new individuals, a form of asexual reproduction. The process is quite slow, it taking 6 months for the madreporite to appear. At 10 months it became functional and the new arms had reached 10mm (0.4 in) long as shown in the image above.

References

Linckia
Animals described in 1840
Taxa named by John Edward Gray